Dizdar was the title given in the Ottoman Empire to a castle warden or fortress commander, appointed to manage troops and keep the fortress in its role as a defence point. 

The word is of Persian origin, meaning gatekeeper, watchman, guardsman or castellan. It spread to the west following the Ottoman conquest of the Balkans. 

Dizdar commanded military unit in the fortress, but at the same time he was responsible for the settlement (village or town) under or around it as well, because the purpose of fortress was to defend the area.

As a commanding person, dizdar had his deputy, called chekhaya, and other subordinates (e.g. yasakci). His superiors were captain, sanjakbeg and other senior military officers.

In 1839 after the Tanzimat reforms, the Ottoman Empire abolished captaincies; the titles like captain and dizdar ceased to exist.

See also
Dizdarević, Bosniak surname derived from the word dizdar
Agha
Beg
Serdar

External links 

 Dizdar = castle warden (in the book The Origins of English Words by Joseph T. Shipley) /page 62/
 Dizdar – commander of a fortress in the Ottoman Empire (from the book The Siege of Shkodra by Marin Barleti /page 241/)
 Disdars or dizdars were castle-holders
 Dizdars as castle commanders in Cyprus under Ottoman administration

Military ranks of the Ottoman Empire
Ottoman titles
Persian words and phrases
Titles in Bosnia and Herzegovina during Ottoman period